Sebastian Kolze Changizi (born 29 December 2000) is a Danish racing cyclist, who currently rides for UCI ProTeam .

Major results
2018
 1st Stage 2 
 2nd Road race, National Junior Road Championships
2022
 1st Stage 1 Course de la Paix U23 – Grand Prix Jeseníky
 1st Stage 4 Flèche du Sud
 1st Stage 1 (TTT) Kreiz Breizh Elites
 2nd Road race, National Under-23 Road Championships
 2nd Gent–Wevelgem U23
 3rd Fyen Rundt
 7th Grand Prix Herning

References

External links

2000 births
Living people
Danish male cyclists
People from Silkeborg